Graeme Clark is a Scottish musician, songwriter and record producer. He came to prominence as bass player, founding member and songwriter from the pop/soul band Wet Wet Wet – the band he formed with friends and fellow band members Neil Mitchell, Tommy Cunningham and Marti Pellow whilst attending Clydebank High School.

The band signed to Polygram Records in 1985 and their debut single – "Wishing I was Lucky" was an immediate hit along with the album "Popped In Souled Out". He performs as a solo artist. He released his debut album ("Mr Understanding"; 2012), and has since released three more eps ("Solitary Soul", "Catching Fire 2013", "Dry Land 2014"). ‘The Thought Collector’ was released in 2016, and ‘Radio Silence’ released in 2018. In recent years Graeme has toured extensively playing solo acoustic shows around the UK.

Career
Graeme Clark was born in a suburb of Clydebank on 15 April 1965. He got his first electric guitar at the age of 10 but admits that his first and abiding interest was in bass playing citing the music of West Side Story, along with Simon and Garfunkel among his early musical memories. During his teenage years Graeme grew to love the music of The Beatles, The Clash, Simon and Garfunkel and then fell for Memphis & Philadelphia soul with the work of Teddy Pendergrass, The O'Jays and The Isley Brothers all having a special focus.

Clark was a founder member of Wet Wet Wet.

As well as Wet Wet Wet, Clark has worked with Chic and collaborated with Nile Rodgers. He started writing solo music for a film, Shoreditch (Malcolm Needs, 2002) starring among others, Shane Ritchie.

Under his own name, Clark penned two songs for a Bollywood movie soundtrack – American Daylight (Roger Christian, 2004). During 2004, he collaborated with James Fox although none of the work was released. In 2010, Clark began working on new songs for his own use and in July 2011, Clark released his first solo EP, "Solitary Soul", recorded both at his home studio, and at the Foundry Music Lab outside Glasgow. At this time Graeme also played his first solo show in Oran Mor, Glasgow along with shows at a number of UK cities later in the year. Graeme's first album, Mr Understanding, was released in February 2012 and another tour followed in April. 

In 2012, Clark admitted to battling drug and alcohol addictions. After seeking treatment he began performing on his own, including in the Wilfred Owen musical, Bullets and Daffodils at the Jermyn Street Theatre.

On 23 March 2018 Graeme returned to his home town of Clydebank to play a special event at Clydebank Town Hall in aid of Teenage Cancer Trust in front of a sell out crowd where he was presented with a Lifetime Recognition Award from West Dunbartonshire Councils Provost.

He toured extensively in 2018 including a full U.K. tour playing with renowned violin/fiddle player Fiona Cuthill.

In 2019 he took to the road with Wet Wet Wet, featuring new front man Kevin Simm and will continue to play solo throughout the year once again joined on stage by Fiona Cuthill.

References

External links

1965 births
Living people
Wet Wet Wet members
Scottish bass guitarists
Musicians from Glasgow
People from Clydebank
People educated at Clydebank High School